Agrostis oregonensis is a species of grass known by the common name Oregon bent grass. It is native to western North America from Alaska to California to Wyoming, where it grows in several habitat types.

Description
It is a perennial bunchgrass growing in 75 centimeters tall. The leaves are flat and up to 30 centimeters long. The inflorescence is a wide open array of wispy branches bearing clusters of spikelets each a few millimeters long.

References

External links
Jepson Manual Treatment
USDA Plants Profile
Photo gallery

oregonensis
Bunchgrasses of North America
Native grasses of California
Grasses of the United States
Grasses of Canada
Flora of Western Canada
Flora of the Western United States
Flora of Oregon
Flora of the Sierra Nevada (United States)
Flora of the Rocky Mountains